Kurt Brand (1917 in Barmen - 1991 in Kaltern) was a German science fiction writer.

1917 births
1991 deaths
German science fiction writers
Writers from Wuppertal
German male writers